Karan Tacker (born 11 May 1986) is an Indian actor, model and host known for his portrayal of Viren Singh Vadhera in Star Plus's Ek Hazaaron Mein Meri Behna Hai and Farooq Ali in Hotstar's Special OPS. In 2014, he participated in Colors TV's Jhalak Dikhhla Jaa 7.

Early life 
His family is from Punjab. He acquired a degree in Business Management before joining the television space.

Career
He first appeared in the film Rab Ne Bana Di Jodi in a short role in 2008. He then got his debut role in television show Love Ne Mila Di Jodi playing the lead role of Sameer which aired on STAR One. Karan then appeared in television show Rang Badalti Odhani (2010) as Shaantanu Khandelwal. He then played the lead role in Star Plus popular show Ek Hazaaron Mein Meri Behna Hai (2011) as Viren Singh Vadhera. The show aired last on 13 September 2013.

Karan participated in the popular dance reality show Jhalak Dikhhla Jaa in the 7th Season of the show along with his dance partner Bhavna and was declared first runner up of the show in 2014. Karan has also hosted Halla Bol on Bindass (2014) and The Voice India (2015) that aired on &TV. Karan has also hosted many award shows and events. Karan has appeared in advertisements also. In 2017, Tacker hosted the dance couple reality show Nach Baliye in its ninth season.

Filmography

Television

Web series

Awards and nominations

References

External links
 
 

Indian male television actors
Living people
1986 births